Lauchringen West station is a railway station in the town of Lauchringen, Baden-Württemberg, Germany. The station lies on the High Rhine Railway. The train services are operated by Deutsche Bahn. Because of the track layout at neighboring , this is the final stop on the High Rhine Railway for trains heading up the Wutach Valley Railway.

Services 
 the following services stop at Lauchringen West:

 RB:

References

External links
 
 

Railway stations in Baden-Württemberg
Buildings and structures in Waldshut (district)